The EMD GP39X is a  diesel-electric locomotive built by the General Motors Electro-Motive Division. All six units built were constructed for the Southern Railway with Southern's characteristic high short hood. They were updated by EMD at Norfolk Southern's (Southern's successor) request to EMD GP49 standards in 1982. Norfolk Southern retired them in 2001, and they now are owned by Tri-Rail, after being upgraded with head end power and a lowered short hood.

References

External links
 Sarberenyi, Robert. EMD GP39X, GP49, and GP50 Original Owners

GP39X
B-B locomotives
Experimental locomotives
Diesel-electric locomotives of the United States
Standard gauge locomotives of the United States